The Kissinger Sommer is a classical music festival held every year in the summer in the city of Bad Kissingen in Bavaria, Southern Germany.

History
The festival was founded in 1986. At the beginning the focus of the festival was on the improvement of the cultural relations between eastern and western Europe. Every year an east-european country was partner of the festival, beginning with Hungary in 1986. Poland, Czechoslovakia and the Soviet Union followed. So the festival became a place where one could see artists from east and west, especially of the partner-countries and of East-Germany. Among the artists of the first years were  Dmitry Sitkovetsky, Boris Pergamenschikow and  Svjatoslav Richter. After the fall of the iron curtain the festival turned to a world-wide view with partner-countries in whole Europe, North America and China. Every summer around 50 concerts are attracting about 30 000 visitors. The occurring interpreters are a mixture of well-known international stars like Cecilia Bartoli, Arcadi Volodos, Fazıl Say or Grigory Sokolov, and newcomers, who often later have made a great career too, like Lang Lang, Diana Damrau or David Garrett.

Director of the "Kissinger Sommer" from 1986 until 2016 was Kari Kahl-Wolfsjäger. Her successor, beginning in 2017, was Tilman Schlömp, formerly artistic director at the festival Beethovenfest in Bonn. He changed the concept of the festival. Instead of partner countries, there are now main topics, starting in 2017 with the motto "1830 – Romantic Revolution" and followed in 2018 by "1918 – emergence of the modern age". The contract of Schlömp ended in 2021. Alexander Steinbeis, previously orchestra director of the DSO Berlin, was appointed as his successor from 2022 on.

In 2020 the festival was cancelled because of the COVID-19 pandemic.

Contemporary music
From the beginning the festival is also a place for contemporary composers like Alfred Schnittke, Sofia Gubaidulina, Edison Denisov, Aribert Reimann or Wolfgang Rihm. There have been world premieres of composers like Jean Françaix (Dixtuor, in 1987), Krzysztof Penderecki (Sinfonietta No. 2 for clarinet and string orchestra, in 1994) and Fazıl Say (Sonata for clarinet and piano, op. 42, in 2012). Since 2006 composers present themselves and premieres of their music in the workshop Bad Kissinger Liederwerkstatt. Up to 2018, around 80 world premieres have already been produced as part of the Liederwerkstatt.

Artists in residence
Artists-in-residence have been in the last years:
 2014 Ning Feng and Igor Levit
 2015 Igor Levit
 2016 Daniil Trifonov
 2017 Patricia Kopatchinskaja and Vesselina Kasarova
 2018 Sol Gabetta
 2019 Julia Lezhneva
 2020 Jean-Yves Thibaudet (planned, festival cancelled)

Orchestra in residence
 2017–2021 Deutsche Kammerphilharmonie Bremen

Luitpold Prize
Every year since 1999 the Luitpoldpreis (Luitpold Prize) is awarded to a young interpreter of the festival. The prize is named after Luitpold, Prince Regent of Bavaria, who let build the great Bad Kissingen concert hall Regentenbau, where many of the concerts of the festival take place. The winners are:

1999 – Nikolaj Znaider, violin
2000 – Alisa Weilerstein, cello
2001 – Jochen Kupfer, baritone
2002 – , soprano
2003 – Baiba Skride, violin
2004 – Jan Kobow, tenor
2005 – Mojca Erdmann, soprano
2006 – Peter Ovtcharov, piano
2007 – Tine Thing Helseth, trumpet
2008 – David Lomeli, tenor
2009 – Igor Levit, piano
2010 – Kejia Xiong, tenor
2011 – Anna Lucia Richter, soprano
2012 – Dmitry Korchak, tenor
2013 – Julia Novikova, soprano
2013 – Konstantin Shamray, piano
2014 – Kian Soltani, cello
2015 – Sung Min Song, tenor
2016 – Andrei Ioniță, cello
2017 – Julian Trevelyan, piano
2018 – , soprano
2019 – , tenor
2020 – not awarded (festival cancelled)
2021 – Sarah Aristidou, soprano
2022 – Lucas & Arthur Jussen, piano

Kissinger Klavierolymp
The festival is connected to the Kissinger Klavierolymp (Kissinger Piano Olympics), a competition of young pianists which takes place in autumn in Bad Kissingen since 2003. The prize for the winners is a performance at the Kissinger Sommer. Among them are Martin Helmchen, Nikolai Tokarev, Kirill Gerstein, Igor Levit, Alice Sara Ott and Kit Armstrong. Among the last winners are Elisabeth Brauß (2016), Emre Yavuz (2017) and Juan Pérez Floristán (2018).

Recipients

References

External links
Homepage "Kissinger Sommer"
Opening concert 2017, Deutsche Kammerphilharmonie Bremen

Music festivals established in 1986
Classical music festivals in Germany
Franconian culture
Summer festivals
Bad Kissingen
Tourist attractions in Bavaria
1986 establishments in Germany